Incredible Crisis, known in Japan as , is a PlayStation video game developed by Polygon Magic. The game was published in Japan by Tokuma Shoten on June 24, 1999. Translated versions were released by Titus Interactive in North America and Europe throughout November 2000.

Incredible Crisis follows four members of a working-class Japanese family on their bizarre adventures from their daily routines while trying to get home early for the family's grandmother's birthday. The game consists of several action-oriented minigames strung together and book-ended with pre-rendered cutscenes. The game was designed and scripted by Kenichi Nishi and features music from the Tokyo Ska Paradise Orchestra.

Gameplay
Incredible Crisis consists of 24 levels (26 in the Japanese version) spread over four main parts, with each part focusing on one of the four family members; Taneo, Etsuko, Tsuyoshi, and Ririka. Each level revolves around a minigame, some of which are repeated, which the player must clear in order to proceed. These games range from action-based objectives such as dodging obstacles and rhythm games, to puzzle-based objectives such as answering a quiz and finding items that are on sale. Each of these levels has a stress meter that represents how close the player is to failing the level objective which, depending on the minigame, fills from either making mistakes, drawing closer to a pursuing obstacle, or running out of time. A life is lost if the meter becomes completely full, with extra lives earned by performing well after each individual chapter. Minigames that have been played in the main story can be replayed from the main menu.

Plot
It is grandmother Hatsu's birthday. She wants everyone home early for her special day: the day that serves as a reminder that she has been alive for more years than she can remember. However, her family has completely forgotten to make up last-minute birthday promises to Hatsu. The game begins like any other normal day for the family members - father Taneo, mother Etsuko, daughter Ririka, and son Tsuyoshi - until strings of events stand as obstacles in their way of returning to Hatsu's with the presents.

The first chapter revolves around father Taneo, who is routinely working in his office (albeit quite tiredly) when suddenly he is ordered to dance by his supervisor along with his peers. After doing so in quite a frenzy, his co-workers then run off, looking quite scared and seem to be running away from something. Taneo turns round to investigate, when he sees a giant boulder-like statue part (which was being placed onto a statue nearby, but accidentally came off) come crashing through the wall; and is forced to run down corridors from it, until he reaches the safety of an elevator which he uses to descend. The boulder comes crashing from above, shooting debris down while Taneo desperately works on activating an emergency stop. Eventually, the boulder also shoots down onto the elevator, and in an explosion, Taneo is shot out of the window. Falling to certain death, Taneo luckily grabs onto a flagpole - but it cannot take his weight, and thus Taneo falls once more; various things slow his descent, and he lands safely. The boulder emerges again through the building's main entrance, but he easily evades it - not long after though, a piece of the statue which was holding the flagpole lands on his head, knocking him unconscious. He later wakes up in an ambulance, strapped to a stretcher while the paramedics ask him questions to check his thinking state. After answering the questions correctly, they accidentally send Taneo - still strapped to the stretcher - out of the ambulance and into the traffic, due to their over-excitement. However, Taneo successfully dodges the traffic and breaks free of his restraints; but when he does so, he crashes into the boulder from before (which miraculously appears). When he recovers, he is helped by an attractive lady, who soon leaves him. Taneo, seemingly in love, follows her onto a Ferris wheel and gives her an erotic back-massage (in this scene, the two characters are only heard but not seen; in the North American version, it is said to be a "back massage", but in the Japanese original, it was hinted at it being a far more sexual act, and although the American version downplayed this, the female still belts out orgasmic-sounding screams when Taneo is successful). Afterwards, she suddenly jumps from the Ferris wheel and onto a helicopter, before pointing out she left a bomb behind Taneo. The bomb explodes, sending Taneo onto the helicopter. Soon he makes it off and sees a UFO, which two navy ships are trying to destroy - for some reason however, Taneo commandeers a turret and shoots down their missiles, saving the UFO. Eventually, Taneo himself is shot upon by a missile, exploding the turret and sending him high into the sky - but somehow lands safely and gets onto a boat. He gets curious about a block on the boat and removes it, which unwittingly starts sinking the boat. Taneo and the boat owner successfully block the hole and get back to shore, where Taneo decides to take an underground train (possibly to avoid any more madness). Once boarding the train, he finds it strangely empty, and the attractive woman from before appears, revealing she has cut the brakes of the train. The train crashes into various blockings on the tracks and shoots up from the underground, where Taneo finds himself miraculously outside of Hatsu's house.

The second chapter focuses on mother Etsuko, who is out buying ingredients for Hatsu's birthday dinner. She soon visits the bank, where she finds it to be in the process of being robbed, but manages to sneak out without being noticed until the last minute. The bank robbers choose to use Etsuko to investigate the money vault, and she is ordered to take a golden piggy-bank, which she finds booby-trapped and thus must replace its weight using the ingredients she has bought thus far. After doing so, she gives it to her captors; who force her to open it by inputting musical commands which two of the bank robbers demonstrate. Once done, they unexpectedly find it open up and transform into a deadly machine, firing off lasers. Etsuko manages to remove its head however using one of her ingredients, and it explodes, throwing her and the bank robbers to the back of the bank and onto a long area of snow. The bank robbers try to shoot her down (possibly because she's a key witness to the crime), but she manages to speed off ahead, and accidentally lands into a gorge. Sometime later, Etsuko awakens in a secret military air jet hangar, where she decides to pilot a jet to get back home. After take off, she discovers that a giant bear (which has a large sign of Ririka on) is roaming and destroying the city; and being the only fighter jet remaining in the sky, she is forced to shoot it down, and succeeds. After its defeat, she returns to Hatsu's house with the ingredients, declaring "Sukiyaki" for dinner.

The third chapter features son Tsuyoshi, who is out reading in a park-like area. To his amazement, he witnesses a teddy bear grow to giant size not too far away (the same bear that Etsuko encountered) which gives off pink rays - one of which comes into contact with Tsuyoshi and shrinks him to miniature ant-like size. To his horror, he is forced to run away from the ants while avoiding mudslides, spiders, and an encounter with a shrunken boat owner like his dad.

The final chapter is told from the perspective of daughter Ririka, who is going to her private girls' school. Once she is in her home room, her friend shows her a new store. Wanting to go there, Ririka makes her classmates switch seats (Many of who get knocked out by chalk sticks thrown by the teacher) so she can get to the exit. Once she's at the shop, Ririka buys a total of 4 things that are on sale. She leaves the shop, but while walking back to class (and probably getting an inevitable chalk smash), she spots a "Take a picture on a bear" machine outside the local Teddy Bear store. While she's getting ready to have hers taken, something similar to a tiny UFO appears and gives the picture an unfortunate angry frown. Ririka yells at the UFO and tries to capture it, but it shoots out purple beams, one hitting the teddy bear dispensed out of the machine. It starts growing while Ririka chases the small UFO into a building, where her friend comes through a door and says, "Ririka! Come sing with us!", starting a minigame taken out for the English version. Ririka then chases the UFO outside, and past a big TV screen where she grabs the UFO. After seeing the mothership on the screen, she calls her dad, Taneo, and tells him to shoot the missiles heading for the mothership after blackmailing him by telling that she wouldn't clean her room ever again. After Taneo agrees, Ririka goes to the screen and plays a game of Simon says by pressing the colors on the small UFO matching the flashing colors of the mothership, interrupted by a "Please Wait" sign and a news story of the giant teddy bear attacking Tokyo, the bank robbery Etsuko witnessed, and the big boulder with Ririka's teacher throwing chalk at it. After that, she goes into the subway and finds a mask belonging to the mysterious woman Taneo encountered, to whom she returns it. She arrives at a bay and rides the boat that her brother and dad rode, also almost sinking it. After Ririka gets to her destination, she gets a delivery bike leaning against a wall and rides away from a crane/bulldozer manned by the bank robbers and the woman Taneo encountered, the lady in red. After that she gets off the street, Ririka and her bike are lifted up, into the mothership, past a famous scene from E.T., crossing the moon. Ririka is unbeamed in front of her house, surprising Hatsu for the last time after Ririka says "Hi mom!"

Development
Incredible Crisis was developed by Polygon Magic. The design and script was done by Kenichi Nishi, a director at Skip Ltd. known for his unconventional approach to game production. The game's art director was Naozumi Yamaguchi, a former Human Entertainment employee who would later go on to work with Sega on projects such as Phantasy Star Universe.

Titus Interactive acquired the rights to publish the game abroad, and introduced it as their only PlayStation title at the Electronic Entertainment Expo in 2000. Virgin Interactive obtained exclusive rights to distribute the game in Europe. Two minigames, which involve bomb disarming and karaoke respectively, were removed from the localized release of the game, reportedly because they relied too much on kanji and Japanese language, making them difficult to translate. The game's musical score was composed by the Tokyo Ska Paradise Orchestra. A CD titled Tondemo Crisis! Original Soundtrack, featuring 25 songs from the game, was released in Japan by Avex Trax on July 23, 1999.

Reception

According to Media Create sales records, the PlayStation version sold 70,760 units by the end of 1999, making it the 184th best-selling video game in Japan for that year. Also, Famitsu gave it a score of 29 out of 40. Elsewhere, the same console version received "favorable" reviews according to the review aggregation website Metacritic. Eric Bratcher of NextGen noted game's short length, but said that all players should play Incredible Crisis at least once.

The PlayStation version was a runner-up for GameSpots annual "Best Game Story" and "Best Puzzle Game" awards among console games. It won the award for "Best Other Game" in both Editors' and Readers' Choice at IGNs Best of 2000 Awards, and was a runner-up for Story.

Jess Ragan of 1Up.com, in his retroactive review, felt that the game, for its time, was an innovative introduction to mini-game compilation titles. Ragan thought that Incredible Crisis was an important first step for this new genre of games, but with its wacky situations and hyperactive ska music, it was outclassed by Nintendo's Wario Ware series.

Notes

References

External links
 

1999 video games
Action video games
Arcade video games
Minigame compilations
PlayStation (console) games
Polygon Magic games
Tecmo games
Tokuma Shoten games
Video games developed in Japan
Single-player video games
Virgin Interactive games